Mauza Sulemaan is a village 18 km from Bhawana City, in the Punjab Province of Pakistan.

References 

Chiniot District
Villages in Chiniot District